Southern Command was a Command of the British Army.

Nineteenth century

Great Britain was divided into military districts on the outbreak of war with France in 1793. By the 1830s the command included the counties of Kent and Sussex (the original Southern District during the Napoleonic Wars) as well as Bedfordshire, Northamptonshire, Oxfordshire and Buckinghamshire (the original South Inland District) and Hampshire, Wiltshire and Dorset (the original South-West District) and Gloucestershire, Worcestershire and Herefordshire (the original Severn District).

The role of South-West District Commander, which was doubled hatted with that of Lieutenant-Governor of Portsmouth, was originally based at Government House in Grand Parade in Portsmouth. This building became very dilapidated and a new Government House was established in the High Street in Portsmouth in 1826. In January 1876 a ‘Mobilization Scheme for the forces in Great Britain and Ireland’ was published, with the ‘Active Army’ divided into eight army corps based on the District Commands. 5th Corps was to be formed within Southern Command, based at Salisbury. This scheme disappeared in 1881, when the districts were retitled ‘District Commands. A third Government House, which was built in red brick on Cambridge Road in Portsmouth, was completed in 1882.

Twentieth century
The 1901 Army Estimates introduced by St John Brodrick allowed for six army corps based on six regional commands. As outlined in a paper published in 1903, II Corps was to be formed in a reconstituted Southern Command, with HQ at Salisbury Plain. Lieutenant General Sir Evelyn Wood was appointed acting General Officer Commanding-in-Chief (GOCinC) of Southern Command on 1 October 1901. Southern Command was initially based at Tidworth Camp.

First World War
At the end of 1914, Lieutenant General Sir Horace Smith-Dorrien, the GOCinC, left Southern Command to form II Corps in France, and Lieutenant General William Campbell was placed in command. On 8 March 1916, Lieutenant-General Sir Henry Sclater, took charge of Southern Command. Sclater served as GOC-in-C there until May 1919.

Second World War
In 1939 regular troops reporting to Southern Command included 1st Armoured Division, based at Andover, and 3rd Infantry Division, based at Bulford. Other Regular Troops reporting to Southern Command at war time included:

8th Royal Tank Regiment
9th Field Regiment, Royal Artillery
6/23 Field Battery, 12th Field Regiment, Royal Artillery
3rd Medium Regiment, Royal Artillery
4th Anti-Aircraft Regiment, Royal Artillery
1st Survey Regiment, Royal Artillery
2nd Survey Regiment, Royal Artillery
2nd Searchlight Regiment, Royal Artillery

Post War
The command moved to Erskine Barracks near Fugglestone St Peter in Wiltshire in 1949. From 1955 to 1961 it included the TA 30th Anti-Aircraft Brigade with its headquarters at Edenbridge in Kent.

In 1968, a new command (Army Strategic Command) was formed at Erskine Barracks, largely staffed by the Southern Command personnel already based there. At the same time a new HQ Southern Command was established at Hounslow Barracks, into which was merged HQ Eastern Command (which was thence disestablished as a separate command). This new, expanded Southern Command, with geographical responsibility across the old Eastern and Southern command areas, was itself merged into HQ UK Land Forces (HQ UKLF) in 1972.

Formation sign variants

During the Second World War and after, Southern Command, in common with other UK Commands, used its formation sign as a badge, (or flash) on uniforms.  The HQ sign itself (see top of this article) with its horizontal red, black, red background colouring indicated an army level command, on which were five stars of the Southern Cross. Uniquely in Southern Command the background colour of the shield, and occasionally the stars, was changed to show the colours of the service corps of the personnel, other commands used their formation sign with an arm of service stripe ( thick) below it. The various designs and changes for visibility or similarity are shown below.

General Officers Commanding
GOCs have included:
General Officer Commanding South-West District
1793–1796 Colonel Thomas Trigge
1796–1799 Lieutenant-General Cornelius Cuyler
February–June 1799 Major-General Thomas Murray
1799–1804 Major-General John Whitelocke
1804–1805 Colonel Hildebrand Oakes
June–December 1805 Major-General Hon. John Hope
1805–1808 Major-General Sir George Prevost
1808–1813 Major-General Arthur Whetham
May–July 1813 Lieutenant-General Hon. Thomas Maitland
January–September 1814 Major-General William Houston
1814–1819 Major-General Kenneth Howard
August–October 1819 Major-General Sir James Kempt
1819–1821 Major-General Sir George Cooke
1821–1828 Major-General Sir James Lyon 
1828–1834 Major-General Sir Colin Campbell
1834–1839 Major-General Sir Thomas McMahon
1839–1846 Major-General Sir Hercules Robert Pakenham
1847–1851 Lieutenant-General Lord Frederick FitzClarence
1851–1852 Major-General Sir George D'Aguilar
1852–1855 Major-General Sir James Simpson
1855–1857 Major-General Henry William Breton
1857–1860 Lieutenant-General the Hon. Sir James Scarlett
1860–1865 Major-General Lord William Paulet
General Officer Commanding Southern District
1865–1870 Lieutenant-General Sir George Buller
1870–1874 General Viscount Templetown
1874–1877 General Sir Charles Hastings Doyle
1877–1878 General Sir John Garvock
1878–1884 General Prince Edward of Saxe-Weimar-Eisenach
1884–1889 General Sir George Willis
1889–1890 General the Hon. Sir Leicester Smyth
1890–1893 Lieutenant-General the Duke of Connaught and Strathearn
1893–1898 Major General Sir John Davis
1898–1903 Lieutenant General Sir Baker Creed Russell
1903–1904 Major General Robert Montgomery
Commander Second Army Corps

In 1901 Second Army Corps was formed, with South East District at Dover, Southern District at Portsmouth and Western District at Devonport under command.
1901–1904 Lieutenant General Sir Evelyn Wood
General Officer Commanding Southern Command
1905–1909 Lieutenant General Sir Ian Hamilton
1909–1912 Lieutenant General Sir Charles Douglas
1912–1914 Lieutenant General Sir Horace Smith-Dorrien
1914–1916 Lieutenant General Sir William Campbell
1916–1919 Lieutenant General Sir Henry Sclater
1919–1922 Lieutenant General Sir George Harper
1923–1924 Lieutenant General Sir Walter Congreve
1924–1928 Lieutenant General Sir Alexander Godley
1928–1931 Lieutenant General Sir Archibald Montgomery-Massingberd
1931–1933 Lieutenant General Sir Cecil Romer
1933–1934 Lieutenant General Sir Percy Radcliffe
1934–1938 Lieutenant General Sir John Burnett-Stuart
1938–1939 Lieutenant General Sir Archibald Wavell
July–August 1939 Lieutenant General Sir Alan Brooke
September 1939 – June 1940 Lieutenant General Sir Bertie Fisher
June–July 1940 Lieutenant General Sir Alan Brooke
July–November 1940 Lieutenant General Sir Claude Auchinleck
December 1940 – February 1942 Lieutenant General Sir Harold Alexander
March 1942 – February 1944 Lieutenant General Sir Charles Loyd
February 1944 – February 1945 Lieutenant General Sir William Morgan
March–June 1945 Lieutenant General Sir Sidney Kirkman
1945–1947 Lieutenant General Sir John Crocker
1947–1948 Lieutenant General Sir John Harding
1949–1952 Lieutenant General Sir Ouvry Roberts
1952–1955 Lieutenant General Sir Ernest Down
1955–1958 Lieutenant General Sir George Erskine
1958–1961 Lieutenant General Sir Nigel Poett
1961–1963 Lieutenant General Sir Robert Bray
1964–1966 Lieutenant General Sir Kenneth Darling
1966–1968 Lieutenant General Sir Geoffrey Baker
1968 Lieutenant General Sir John Mogg
1968–1969 Lieutenant General Sir David Peel Yates
1969–1971 Lieutenant General Sir Michael Carver
1971–1972 Lieutenant General Sir Basil Eugster

References

Sources

External links
 Southern Command (1930-38) at www.BritishMilitaryHistory.co.uk
 Southern Command (1939) at www.BritishMilitaryHistory.co.uk

Commands of the British Army